Frederick III, Prince of Salm-Kyrburg (Frederick John Otto Francis Christian Philip; 1744–1794) was the prince of Salm-Kyrburg, Hornes and Overijse, Gemen and Count of Solre-le-Château. He was the eldest son of Philip Joseph, Prince of Salm-Kyrburg and Princess Maria Theresa of Hornes, and he grew up at the French court. Through his mother, the eldest daughter of Maximilian, Prince of Hornes, he inherited all the possessions of the Hornes family. He held the title from 1779 to 1794.

Dutch Patriots

Frederick played an important role as a military leader of the Dutch Republic during the era of the Patriots as a negotiator with the Austrian emperor Joseph II, to dismantle the Barrier treaties 1709-1715.  As commander of the Legion of the Rhine (Legioen van de Rijngraaf van Salm), formed by Count of Salm during the Kettle War in 1784, his troops were responsible for the defense of the republic. The troops included eight companies of Cavalry (Hussars and Cuirassiers), two companies of Jaegers, and six companies of Foot, including sharpshooters. In 1786, Holland employed him to maintain an army, but six months later dismissed his regiment to save money. In Amsterdam a fund was set up to support his troops so that Von Salm, eager to replace the Stadtholder, could remain.

On May 12, 1787 Frederick led the army to Utrecht, to protect the Patriot occupation of the "democratic Eldorado".  On the 28 June, he marched to Woerden to capture princess Wilhelmina of Prussia, the wife of the Prince of Orange.  Early September 1787, the Gelder Jaeger corps occupied Makkum on the initiative of Court Lambertus van Beyma. When Frederick William II of Prussia invaded the Dutch Republic, Frederick left Utrecht three days later, without giving battle.  His regiment retreated through Amsterdam to Weesp, and Frederick endured heavy criticism.

There are different versions of what happened next.  He may have remained hidden for a few months in the house of Henry Hope. Possibly, he secretly left the city of Amsterdam within a week and stopped in Jever, but as East-Frisia was Prussian, that is not very likely.  He may have fled to his brother at Grumbach in the Rhineland-Palatinate In the summer of 1788,  one of the leading patriots Pieter Paulus refused to admit him on a visit to Paris.  In 1791, Quint Ondaatje, his personal assistant, wrote him an apology.

In 1794, he was guillotined together with Alexandre de Beauharnais, the lover of Amalie Zephyrine van Salm-Kyrburg, for their ties with the "Ancien Régime".

Hôtel de Salm

Frederick commissioned the construction of the Hôtel de Salm in Paris, where Madame de Stael gave her soirees in 1797.  From 1804, the Légion d'honneur resided in the building, but it was destroyed by fire in 1871.  The structure was rebuilt and is now known as the Palais de la Légion d'Honneur.  Henry Hope wanted to copy the Hôtel de Salm in Haarlem, for his Villa Welgelegen.

Marriage and issue

Frederick married in 1781 to Princess Johanna Francesca of Hohenzollern-Sigmaringen, daughter of Karl Friedrich, Prince of Hohenzollern-Sigmaringen.  They had four children, of whom only one lived to adulthood:

Princess Philippine Friederike Wilhelmine (1783–1786)
Hereditary Prince Frederick Henry Otto (1785–1786)
Prince Frederick Emmanuel Otto Louis Philip Conrad (1786)
Prince Frederick IV Ernest Otto Philip Anton Furnibert (1789–1859), his father's successor

Ancestry

References 
 This article is based entirely or partially on its equivalent on Dutch Wikipedia.

 Information on the formation of the Rijngraaf of Salm's legion

Princes of Hornes
People of the Patriottentijd
People executed by guillotine during the French Revolution
Executed German people
1744 births
1794 deaths
Burials at Picpus Cemetery
Recipients of the Order of the White Eagle (Poland)